Abir Ranjan Biswas is an Indian politician who currently serves as a member of parliament in the Rajya Sabha for West Bengal. Biswas is a member of the All India Trinamool Congress.

References

Living people
Trinamool Congress politicians from West Bengal
Year of birth missing (living people)